The Technische Universität Braunschweig (unofficially University of Braunschweig – Institute of Technology), commonly referred to as TU Braunschweig, is the oldest  (comparable to an institute of technology in the American system) in Germany. It was founded in 1745 as Collegium Carolinum and is a member of TU9, an incorporated society of the most renowned and largest German institutes of technology. It is commonly ranked among the top universities for engineering in Germany. TU Braunschweig's research profile is very interdisciplinary, but with a focus on aeronautics, vehicle engineering including autonomous driving and electric mobility, manufacturing, life sciences, and metrology. Research is conducted in close collaboration with external organizations such as the German Aerospace Center, Helmholtz Centre for Infection Research, several Fraunhofer Institutes, and Germany's national metrology institute (PTB), among many others. As one of very few research institutions of its type in the world, the university has its own research airport.

Name 
Its complete name is Technische Universität Braunschweig. Translating the name into English is discouraged by the university, but its preferred translation is University of Braunschweig - Institute of Technology or its short form Braunschweig Institute of Technology. While the word "technology" in its name implies a focus on science and engineering, it is still a university in the sense that it represents a wide range of subjects. It is subdivided into six faculties with different degree programmes and specialisations.

Research 

The TU Braunschweig focuses its research in four main areas: Future City, Metrology, Mobility and Infections and Therapeutics. The university's researchers cooperate closely with other research institutions in Braunschweig.

Future City 
The scientists at the TU Braunschweig are developing concepts for the intelligent future cities. The aim is to find solutions for efficient, eco-friendly, healthy, social and green Smart Cities.

Metrology 
Nanoscale materials and components measuring only millionths of a millimetre have become indispensable in many procedures. Their measurement requires new approaches in nanometrology. The Laboratory for Emerging Nanometrology and Analytics (LENA) is investigating the limits of the measurable together with the Physikalisch-Technische Bundesanstalt.

Mobility 
The researchers are working towards a seamless multimodal mobility system. This focus bundles research in the automotive sector, aerospace technology and rail technology. Important topics are intelligent and interconnected mobility, low-emission vehicles using non-fossil energies and sustainable production. In addition, traffic management, logistics and social impacts are considered. Together with scientists from around the world, TU Braunschweig aims at reducing the number of traffic accidents. The researchers are developing novel materials and surfaces that help reduce fuel consumption and noise, and are developing next-generation energy sources. Interdisciplinary research is tied together in the NFL - Aeronautics Research Centre Niedersachsen and the NFF – Automotive Research Centre Niedersachsen.

Infections and Therapeutics 
The Braunschweig Integrated Centre of Systems Biology (BRICS) combines natural sciences, engineering and information technology to systems biology. Together with the Helmholtz Centre for Infection Research and the Leibniz Institute DSMZ (German Collection of Microorganisms and Cell Cultures) strategies against infectious microorganisms are developed. This also includes natural substances consisting of microorganisms. The manufacturing and processing of these agents is the subject of the Center of Pharmaceutical Engineering (PVZ).

Research centres 
In addition to the main areas of research, the research profile of the TU Braunschweig is shaped by several interdisciplinary and interdepartmental research associations, which are structured in research centres.

Battery Lab Factory (BLB) 
BLB is a research centre of the TU Braunschweig. The centre is an interdisciplinary research platform for the development of production processes as well as diagnosis and simulation for current lithium-ion batteries and future battery technologies such as solid state and lithium-sulphur batteries. BLB unites 13 professorships from three universities (TU Braunschweig, TU Clausthal, University of Hannover) as well as battery experts from the PTB and integrates the necessary competences along the value chain for excellent R&D in the field of batteries in Lower Saxony.

Braunschweig Integrated Centre of Systems Biology (BRICS) 
The BRICS is an interdisciplinary centre in cooperation with the Helmholtz Centre for Infection Research. Three departments of the Helmholtz Centre as well as institutes from three faculties of the TU Braunschweig work together. At BRICS, microorganisms in the fields of biotechnology and infection research are investigated using systems biology methods. Mathematical models will be used to develop new anti-infectives and new biotechnological production processes.

Laboratory for Emerging Nanometrology and Analytics (LENA) 
In the Laboratory for Emerging Nanometrology, institutes of the TU Braunschweig conduct research together with departments of the Physikalisch-Technische Bundesanstalt. Research topics are nanonormals, method developments as well as ubiquitous sensors and standards. The focus is on the metrology of 3-dimensional Nano systems.

Automotive Research Centre Niedersachsen (NFF) 
At the Automotive Research Centre in Lower Saxony, scientists working on the Metropolitan Car are collaborating to find answers to the social and ecological challenges associated with increased urbanization. In addition to the TU Braunschweig, which plays a leading role, the German Aerospace Center (DLR) and Leibniz Universität Hannover are also involved.

Aeronautics Research Centre Niedersachsen (NFL) 
The Technical University of Braunschweig, the DLR and the Leibniz University Hannover are pooling their wide-ranging expertise in the Lower Saxony Research Centre for Aeronautics to promote basic, coordinated research programmes in the field of aeronautics and space technology.

Center of Pharmaceutical Engineering (PVZ) 
The researchers at PVZ want to make it possible to produce drugs that are more cost-effective and, for example, exactly tailored to the patient's needs. This aim is to be achieved with new manufacturing technologies. Experts from pharmacy, process engineering and micro technology are working together on a long-term basis in a model that is unique in Germany to date.

Faculties and departments 
The university has six faculties (German: Fakultäten). Some faculties are divided further into departments (German: Departments). All faculties are additionally divided into numerous institutes.
Carl-Friedrich-Gauß-Faculty
 Department of Mathematics
 Department of Computer Science
 Department of Business Administration and Economics
Department of Social Sciences
Faculty of Life Sciences
 Faculty of Architecture, Civil Engineering and Environmental Sciences
 Department of Architecture
 Department of Civil Engineering and Environmental Science
 Faculty of Mechanical Engineering
 Faculty of Electrical Engineering, Information Technology, Physics
 Faculty of Humanities and Educational Sciences

Governmental testing and certification work 
Commonly known in Germany, and particularly in the field of passive fire protection, as TU Braunschweig, its iBMB Institute has been accredited by the German Institute for Building Technology (Deutsches Institut für Bautechnik) and has, for decades, performed public testing for the purpose of establishing fire-resistance ratings of products and systems for manufacturers. iBMB also assists the DIBt in third-party vendor inspections (product certification) and quality control testing, in an effort to maintain DIBt approvals. iBMB was also instrumental in leading the Eureka project, which has become a guideline for building codes and regulations governing fire protection measures for traffic tunnels.

Notable people 

Current and former members of the TU Braunschweig include the mathematicians Carl Friedrich Gauss and Richard Dedekind, Nobel laureates Klaus von Klitzing, Manfred Eigen, and Georg Wittig, aerospace engineer Adolf Busemann, the former CEOs of SAP, Metro Group, and Henkel (Henning Kagermann, Erwin Conradi, and Konrad Henkel), BMW CEO Harald Krüger, Porsche CEO Oliver Blume, Airbus Defence and Space CEO Dirk Hoke, Siemens Mobility CEO Michael Peter, former Eurocopter CEO Lutz Bertling, and truck engineer and entrepreneur Heinrich Büssing of Büssing AG, engineer and founder of Claas KGaA mbH August Claas and world-renowned architect Meinhard von Gerkan.

References

External links 

 Official site
 Brief portrait

 
Braunschweig
Technical universities and colleges in Germany
University
University
Educational institutions established in 1745
1745 establishments in the Holy Roman Empire
Education in Braunschweig